Time to Destination is the second full album of the Japanese pop rock group Every Little Thing, released on April 15, 1998. It is the best-selling album from the band, with 3,520,330 copies sold, also becoming the 10th best-selling album of all time in Japan.

Track listing
All songs written, composed and arranged by Mitsuru Igarashi, unless otherwise noted.

Chart positions

External links
 Time to Destination information at Avex Network.
 Time to Destination information at Oricon.
 Time to Destination information at Mora.jp (song length)

1998 albums
Every Little Thing (band) albums